Nolen Niu (born 1975) is an American Industrial Designer who received his Bachelor of Science in Industrial Design from the Art Center College of Design located in Pasadena, California.

His company, Nolen Niu, Inc., provides services including corporate branding, product design for consumer electronics and furniture. Niu's corporate office is located in Beverly Hills with a studio and showroom located in Hollywood, California.

Articles
The New York Times
Apartment Therapy: Los Angeles
MoCo Loco
square. Magazine

External links
Nolen Niu Official Website
Behind the Designs: Interview with Nolen Niu

1975 births
Living people
American industrial designers
American furniture designers